Humanitarian Aid Commission (HAC) is the Governmental body that managed and organized all humanitarian work carried on in Sudan along with the Ministry of Humanitarian Affairs.

History and development 
Sudan first established unit to organized and facilitate Humanitarian Aid in 1985  When Sudan experienced  major  drought in 1984.

Laws and agreements 
Humanitarian Aid Commission (HAC) is the regulating body working under the Sudanese law.

Laws organizing the humatiraian organization then developed

HAC organize the International Organization work in Sudan by the Technical agreements and Country Agreements. HAC also monitor  and insure the  enforcing of laws concerning the composition and operation of local and international NGOs, as well as UN agents and other multilateral aid agencies.

References

Government of Sudan